Bilse is a surname. Notable people with the surname include:

 Benjamin Bilse (1816–1902), German conductor and composer
 Fritz Oswald Bilse (1878–1951), German author and lieutenant of the Prussian army

See also
 Bille (surname)